The second round of CAF matches for 2018 FIFA World Cup qualification was played from 11 to 17 November 2015.

Format
A total of 40 teams (teams ranked 1–27 in the CAF entrant list and 13 first round winners) played home-and-away over two legs. The 20 winners advanced to the third round.

Seeding
The draw for the second round was held as part of the 2018 FIFA World Cup Preliminary Draw on 25 July 2015, starting 18:00 MSK (UTC+3), at the Konstantinovsky Palace in Strelna, Saint Petersburg, Russia.

The seeding was based on the FIFA World Rankings of July 2015 (shown in parentheses). The 27 direct qualifiers are seeded into three pots:
Pot 1 contained the teams ranked 1–13.
Pot 2 contained the teams ranked 14–20.
Pot 3 contained the teams ranked 21–27.

Each tie contained a team from Pot 1 and a first round winner (first 13 ties) which were automatically allocated into each tie (winner of first round tie 1 into second round tie 1, etc.), or a team from Pot 2 and a team from Pot 3 (last seven ties), with the team from Pot 1 or Pot 2 hosting the second leg. As the draw was held before the first round was played, the identities of the first round winners were not known at the time of the draw.

Note: Bolded teams qualified for the third round.

Matches
|}

Cameroon won 3–0 on aggregate and advanced to the third round.

Tunisia won 4–2 on aggregate and advanced to the third round.

Guinea won 3–0 on aggregate and advanced to the third round.

Congo won 6–4 on aggregate and advanced to the third round.

Egypt won 4–1 on aggregate and advanced to the third round.

Ghana won 2–0 on aggregate and advanced to the third round.

Nigeria won 2–0 on aggregate and advanced to the third round.

Mali won 3–2 on aggregate and advanced to the third round.

DR Congo won 6–2 on aggregate and advanced to the third round.

Ivory Coast won 4–0 on aggregate and advanced to the third round.

Senegal won 5–2 on aggregate and advanced to the third round.

Cape Verde won 2–1 on aggregate and advanced to the third round.

Algeria won 9–2 on aggregate and advanced to the third round.

Zambia won 3–0 on aggregate and advanced to the third round.

Libya won 4–1 on aggregate and advanced to the third round.

Morocco won 2–1 on aggregate and advanced to the third round.

1–1 on aggregate. Gabon won the penalty shoot-out 4–3 and advanced to the third round.

Burkina Faso won 3–2 on aggregate and advanced to the third round.

Uganda won 4–0 on aggregate and advanced to the third round.

South Africa won 4–1 on aggregate and advanced to the third round.

Goalscorers
There were 97 goals scored in 40 matches, for an average of  goals per match.

4 goals

 Islam Slimani

3 goals

 Farouk Miya

2 goals

 Faouzi Ghoulam
 Cédric Amissi
 Héldon Ramos
 Thievy Bifouma
 Yannick Bolasie
 Firmin Ndombe Mubele
 Giovanni Sio
 Ahmed Hassan Mahgoub
 Getaneh Kebede
 Naby Keïta
 Mohamed El Monir
 Mame Biram Diouf
 Winston Kalengo

1 goal

 Yacine Brahimi
 Riyad Mahrez
 Carl Medjani
 Gelson
 Babatounde Bello
 Stéphane Sessègnon
 Tapiwa Gadibolae
 Joel Mogorosi
 Préjuce Nakoulma
 Jonathan Pitroipa
 Bertrand Traoré
 Fiston Abdul Razak
 Vincent Aboubakar
 Stéphane Mbia
 Edgar Salli
 Ezechiel N'Douassel
 Hardy Binguila
 Delvin N'Dinga
 Francis N'Ganga
 Fabrice Ondama
 Michaël Nkololo
 Cyriac
 Jean Seri
 Mohamed Elneny
 Abdallah El Said
 Dawit Fekadu
 Shimelis Bekele
 Rui
 Malick Evouna
 Jordan Ayew
 Mubarak Wakaso
 Idrissa Sylla
 Michael Olunga
 Faisal Al Badri
 Mohamed Al Ghanodi
 Faneva Imà Andriatsima
 Njiva Rakotoharimalala
 Cheick Diabaté
 Bakary Sako
 Samba Sow
 Cheikh Moulaye Ahmed
 Oumar N'Diaye
 Yacine Bammou
 Youssef El-Arabi
 Hélder Pelembe
 Efe Ambrose
 Moses Simon
 Jacques Tuyisenge
 Moussa Konaté
 Cheikhou Kouyaté
 Sadio Mané
 Thamsanqa Gabuza
 Andile Jali
 Tokelo Rantie
 Elias Maguri
 Mbwana Samatta
 Syam Ben Youssef
 Saad Bguir
 Yassine Chikhaoui
 Wahbi Khazri
 Geofrey Massa
 Lubambo Musonda

1 own goal

 Manucho Diniz
 Dieumerci Mbokani

Notes

References

External links

Qualifiers – Africa: Round 2, FIFA.com
2018 FIFA World Cup Russia - Qualifiers, CAFonline.com

2
Qual
Tunisia at the 2018 FIFA World Cup
Nigeria at the 2018 FIFA World Cup
Morocco at the 2018 FIFA World Cup
Senegal at the 2018 FIFA World Cup
Egypt at the 2018 FIFA World Cup